The 24th edition of the annual Hypo-Meeting took place on May 30 and May 31, 1998 in Götzis, Austria. The track and field competition, featuring a men's decathlon and a women's heptathlon event, was part of the inaugural 1998 IAAF World Combined Events Challenge series of meetings.

Men's Decathlon

Schedule

May 30

May 31

Records

Results

Women's Heptathlon

Schedule

May 30

May 31

Records

Results

Notes

See also
1998 European Athletics Championships – Men's Decathlon
1998 Decathlon Year Ranking
1998 European Championships in Athletics - Women's heptathlon

References
 decathlon2000
 IAAF results
 decathlonfans
 IAAF 1998 Year Ranking Heptathlon

1998
Hypo-Meeting
Hypo-Meeting